Maghval, also known as Megwal and Meghwad, is a village in the Kaparada taluka of Valsad district in Gujarat State, India. It is a small enclave belonging to Gujarat, but located within Nagar Haveli, just south of Silvassa in the Indian union territory of Dadra and Nagar Haveli and Daman and Diu. In January 2022, the government of India announced plans for the Maghval enclave to become part of Dadra and Nagar Haveli and Daman and Diu.

Geography
Maghval, though under the administrative purview of Gujarat, is surrounded by the union territory of Dadra and Nagar Haveli and Daman and Diu (DNHDD), outside the state boundary and a few kilometres from Silvassa in DNHDD. The village with 2,160 villagers (as of February 2018) has a rich landscape with the Daman Ganga River cutting through it, leaving a hilly stretch on one side and plains on the other.

History
Formerly "Bombay Enclave," Maghval was a British counter-enclave within the Portuguese enclave within British India until independence.

References 

Villages in Valsad district